Pristava is a settlement on the left bank of the Ščavnica River in the Municipality of Ljutomer in northeastern Slovenia. The area traditionally belonged to the Styria region and is now included in the Mura Statistical Region.

The local chapel in the centre of the village was built in 1888 and renovated in 1999.

References

External links
Pristava on Geopedia

Populated places in the Municipality of Ljutomer